Deevirus is a genus of viruses in the realm Ribozyviria, containing the single species Deevirus actinopterygii. Various ray-finned fishes (Actinopterygii) serve as its hosts.

References 

Virus genera